Muhammad Urfaq (born 30 November 1961) is a Pakistani athlete. He represented Pakistan at the 1988 Summer Olympics and competed in the men's long jump that year.

References

1963 births
Living people
Athletes (track and field) at the 1988 Summer Olympics
Pakistani male long jumpers
Olympic athletes of Pakistan
Place of birth missing (living people)